This article is a list of wars and conflicts involving Luxembourg since its full independence from the United Kingdom of the Netherlands in 1890.

See also
 List of wars in the Low Countries until 1560 – includes wars on the present territory of Luxembourg until 1560.
 List of wars in the southern Low Countries (1560–1829) – includes wars on the present territory of Luxembourg, including the Southern Netherlands (Spanish Netherlands & Austrian Netherlands), the Principality of Liège, the Princely Abbey of Stavelot-Malmedy, the Prince-Bishopric of Cambrésis and the Imperial City of Cambray, the Duchy of Bouillon and smaller states.
 List of wars involving the Netherlands (1815–1839) – includes colonial wars in which Luxembourg participated in personal union with the United Kingdom of the Netherlands

References

Luxembourg
Luxembourg history-related lists